Tunstead is a village and a civil parish in the English county of Norfolk. The village is 10.7 miles north north east of the city of Norwich, 15 miles south south east of Cromer and 129 miles north east of London. Tunstead is 2.5 miles north of the settlements of Wroxham and Hoveton.

The villages name means 'Farmstead'. 'Hundred Hill' on Bradfield Common may mark the boundary with North Erpingham hundred rather than the meeting-place of the Tunstead hundred.

The nearest railway station is at Wroxham & Hoveton for the Bittern Line which runs between Sheringham, Cromer and Norwich. The nearest airport is Norwich International Airport.

For the purposes of local government, the parish falls within the district of North Norfolk. At the time of the 2001 census, the parish had a population of 674, increasing to 744 at the 2011 census.

See also
Tunstead & Sco-Ruston village website

References

External links

Villages in Norfolk
Civil parishes in Norfolk
North Norfolk